Thomas Terry Davis (before 1789 – November 15, 1807) was a United States representative from Kentucky.

Education and early career
Davis studied law and in 1789 was admitted to the Kentucky bar. He was a lawyer in private practice and was deputy attorney, Kentucky; he was first prosecuting attorney for district, Kentucky and was a member of the Kentucky House of Representatives from 1795 to 1797.

National political career
Davis was elected as a Democratic-Republican to the 5th, 6th and 7th Congresses, serving from March 4, 1797 to March 3, 1803.

He was appointed United States judge of Indiana Territory Supreme Court on February 8, 1803 and was chancellor of Indiana Territory in 1806 and 1807. He presided over the treason trial of Davis Floyd during his tenure there.

Personal life
Davis was a Freemason, he married Elizabeth Robards, who went on to marry Floyd 2 years after Davis' death. He died in Jeffersonville, Indiana.

References

Year of birth unknown
18th-century births
1807 deaths
Indiana state court judges
Indiana Territory officials
Members of the Kentucky House of Representatives
Democratic-Republican Party members of the United States House of Representatives from Kentucky